James Edmunds may refer to:

 James E. Edmunds (born 1970), Republican member of the Virginia House of Delegates
 James M. Edmunds (1810–1879), U.S. politician from Michigan
 James R. Edmunds Jr. (1890–1953), American architect
 James Edmunds (British politician) (1882–1962), British Member of Parliament for Cardiff East
 James Edmunds (Home and Away), fictional character from the Australian soap opera Home and Away